Contextual learning is based on a constructivist theory of teaching and learning. Learning takes place when teachers are able to present information in such a way that students are able to construct meaning based on their own experiences. Contextual learning experiences include internships, service learning and study abroad programs.

Contextual learning has the following characteristics:
 emphasizing problem solving
 recognizing that teaching and learning need to occur in multiple contexts
 assisting students in learning how to monitor their learning and thereby become self-regulated learners
 anchoring teaching in the diverse life context of students
 encouraging students to learn from each other
 employing authentic assessment

Key elements
Current perspectives on what it means for learning to be contextualized include
 situated cognition – all learning is applied knowledge
 social cognition – intrapersonal constructs
 distributed cognition – constructs that are continually shaped by other people and things outside the individual

Constructivist learning theory maintains that learning is a process of constructing meaning from experience

Benefits

 Both direct instruction and constructivist activities can be compatible and effective in the achievement of learning goals.
 Increasing one’s efforts results in more ability. This theory opposes the notion that one’s aptitude is unchangeable. Striving for learning goals motivates an individual to be engaged in activities with a commitment to learning.
 Children learn the standards values, and knowledge of society by raising questions and accepting challenges to find solutions that are not immediately apparent. Other learning processes are explaining concepts, justifying their reasoning and seeking information. Therefore, learning is a social process which requires social and cultural factors to be considered during instructional planning. This social nature of learning also drives the determination of the learning goals.
 Knowledge and learning are situated in particular physical and social context. A range of settings may be used such as the home, the community, and the workplace, depending on the purpose of instruction and the intended learning goals.
 Knowledge may be viewed as distributed or stretched over the individual, other persons, and various artifacts such as physical and symbolic tools  and not solely as a property of individuals. Thus, people, as an integral part of the learning process, must share knowledge and tasks.

Assessment 
One of the main goals of contextual learning is to develop an authentic task to assess performance.   Creating an assessment in a context can help to guide the teacher to replicate real world experiences and make necessary inclusive design decisions.  Contextual learning can be used as a form of formative assessment and can help give educators a stronger profile on how the intended learning goals, standards and benchmarks fit the curriculum.  It is essential to establish and align the intended learning goals of the contextual task at the beginning to create a shared understanding of what success looks like.  Self-directed theory states that humans by nature seek purpose and the desire to make a contribution and to be part of a cause greater and more enduring then oneself.  Contextual learning can help bring relevance and meaning to the learning, helping students relate to the world they live in.

Questions to address when defining and developing a contextual task 
 Does the task fulfill the intended learning goals?
 Does the task involve problems that require the students to use their knowledge creatively to find a solution?
 Is the task an engaging learning experience?
 Is the audience as authentic as possible?
 Does the task require students to use processes, products and procedures that simulate those used by people working in a similar field?  
 Is the task inclusive?
 Are there clear criteria for students on how the product, performance or service will be evaluated?
 Are there models of excellence which demonstrate standards?
 Are the students involved in the assessment process?
 Is there a provision made for continuous formative feedback, from oneself, from teachers and peers to help the students improve?
 Is there an opportunity for student choice and ownership to the extent that would be.

GRASPS Concept Wheel

See also
 Context-based learning
 Experiential learning

References

Alternative education